Operation Saffraan was a series of South African Defence Force raids from the Caprivi Strip area during the South African Border War. On August 23, 1978, PLAN and the Zambian army shelled the small South African garrison town Katimo Mulilo in eastern Caprivi (Namibia). In March 1979, South African forces entered south-western Zambia attacking PLAN bases in retaliation for the shelling of Katimo Mulilo. These bases were around Sinjembele and the Njinje forest, were found to have been vacated but the facilities were destroyed disrupting future border infiltrations. The raid into Zambia resulted in SWAPO being asked to leave the country. Conducted on 7 March 1979 concurrently with Operation Rekstok; it followed Operation Reindeer and preceded Operation Sceptic.

See also
Angolan Civil War

References

Further reading
 
 
 Nothling, CD (Col.). Kort Kroniek van Militêre Operasies en Optredes in Suidwes-Afrika en Angola (1914-1988). Scientia Militaria: South African Journal of Military Studies, Vol 19, Nr 2, 1989.

Conflicts in 1979
1979 in Angola
1979 in South West Africa
1979 in South Africa
Cross-border operations of South Africa
Battles and operations of the South African Border War